Priotrochus obscurus is a species of sea snail, a marine gastropod mollusk in the family Trochidae, the top snails.

Subspecies
 Priotrochus obscurus obscurus (Wood, 1828) (synonyms: Gibbula (Priotrochus) sepulchralis (Melvill, 1899); Gibbula sepulchralis (Melvill, 1899); Priotrochus sepulchralis Melvill, 1899; Trochus nabateus Issel, 1869; Trochus signatus Jonas, 1844)
 † Priotrochus obscurus ponsonbyi (G. B. Sowerby, 1888) (synonyms: Monilea (Priotrochus) ponsonbyi (G. B. Sowerby, 1888); Monilea obscura ponsonbyi (G.B. Sowerby, 1888); Monilea ponsonbyi (G.B. Sowerby, 1888); Priotrochus alexandri Tomlin, 1926; Trochus (Gibbula) ponsonbyi G. B. Sowerby, 1888; Trochus ponsonbyi G.B. Sowerby, 1888)

Description
The shell size varies between 7 mm and 20 mm. The very solid, thick, narrowly perforated shell has a conical shape and is elevated. It is ashen-white, with longitudinal chestnut streaks or maculations. The spire is elevated. The apex is acute. The sutures are slightly impressed, the whorl below them closely appressed. The shell contains 6 to 7 whorls. The upper ones are subangular and nodulose in the middle. The body whorl shows a coronal series of knobs, on large specimens becoming obsolete toward the aperture. The entire surface is traversed by spiral lirulae, much narrower than the densely obliquely striate interstices. The oblique, ovate aperture is about half the length of shell. The outer lip is bevelled to an edge. The aperture is spirally lirate. The edge of the columella is denticulate. Its upper insertion is callous, partly or nearly covering the umbilicus. Young specimens are subbiangulate with nodulose periphery.

Distribution
This species is distributed in the Red Sea and in the Indian Ocean off Madagascar, Mozambique, Tanzania and Durban, South Africa.

References

 Dautzenberg, Ph. (1929). Mollusques testacés marins de Madagascar. Faune des Colonies Francaises, Tome III
 Spry, J.F. (1961). The sea shells of Dar es Salaam: Gastropods. Tanganyika Notes and Records 56
 Herbert D.G. (1988). A new species of Priotrochus (Mollusca: Gastropoda: Trochidae) from south-east Africa. Annals of the Natal Museum 29(2):503–507
 Herbert D.G. (1994). Trochus kotschyi, the first Indian Ocean record of the genus Osilinus (Mollusca: Gastropoda: Trochidae). Journal of Zoology 233:345–357.
 Bonfitto A., Sabelli B., Tommasini S. & Herbert D. (1994). Marine molluscan taxa from Mozambique described by G.G. Bianconi and preserved in the Zoological Museum of the University of Bologna. Annals of the Natal Museum 35:133–138.
 Zuschin, M., Janssen, R. & Baal, C. (2009). Gastropods and their habitats from the northern Red Sea (Egypt: Safaga). Part 1: Patellogastropoda, Vetigastropoda and Cycloneritimorpha. Annalen des Naturhistorischen Museums in Wien 111[A]: 73–158. page(s): 104

External links
 
 D.G. Herbert, Studies on Priotrochus obscurus and the systematic position of Priotrochus (Mollusca: Gastropoda: Trochidae); Journal of Zoology, 1988 – Wiley Online Library

obscurus
Gastropods described in 1828